Soham Chakraborty (born 4 March 1984), is an Indian actor, producer, television personality and politician. He has appeared in more than 100 Bengali films, as child artist (Master Bittu) and as male lead. He earned numerous accolades, including Uttam Kumar Awards, BFJA Awards and Star Jalsha Entertainment Awards. Chakraborty has a significant following in West Bengal, Assam and other adjacent states in India and Bangladesh. He is a member of All India Trinamool Congress. He contested 2016 West Bengal Legislative Assembly election from Borjora Constituency.

Acting career 

Soham Chakraborty made his Tollywood debut in 1988 with the popular Bengali film Choto Bou. Early in his career, Chakraborty was recognised as Master Bittu featured in several films as a child artist including Mangal Deep  in 1989, Nayan Moni in 1989, Jowar Bhata in 1990, Satyajit Ray directed Shakha Proshakha  in 1990, Bhagya Debata  in 1997, starring Mithun Chakraborty and several other noted films. He was awarded Uttam Kumar Awards twice as Child Artist of the year for his performance in Jowar Bhata (1991) and Shakha Proshakha (1990). He has appeared in several television series and has played supporting roles in films in the late 1990s and early 2000s. After completing his higher education in the field of B.Com. (Hons.), he appeared in Chander Bari , directed by Tarun Majumdar (2007). 
Chakraborty, has described the difficult phase and struggling days in his acting career to appear in the big budget films. 
He was then launched with the film Bajimaat (2008), as male lead. He then rose to prominence after starring in 2009 film Prem Aamar  directed by Raj Chakraborty and produced by Shree Venkatesh Films, which turned out a blockbuster and recorded highest grosser in Bengali film's history. After Prem Aamar his previously shot films Rahasya, Jeena, and Soldier were released and were commercially average. His other blockbuster film Amanush was released in 2010. The film was directed by Rajib Biswas. Chakraborty played the role of Vinod, an orphan who has suffered a lot of physical and mental torture in his childhood. 
He went on to films such as Faande Poriya Boga Kaande Re  (2011), Jibon Rong Berong  (2011), Ley Halua Ley  (2012), Jaaneman (2012), Bojhe Na Shey Bojhe Na  (2012), Loveria  (2013), Bangali Babu English Mem  (2014), Amanush 2  (2015) and Black (2015 Bengali Film) . The series of comedies and family dramas that followed, earned Chakraborty widespread adulation from audiences, particularly among teenagers. Such films are Jamai 420 ( 2015), Katmundu  (2015), Jio Pagla  (2017) and  Honeymoon (2018), JamaiBadal  (2019) and Thai Curry  (2019). His other blockbuster film Shudhu Tomari Jonya  ( 2015), along with Dev, remains a highest-grosser and has been screened in Mumbai and New Delhi. 
In 2015, Chakraborty was appointed the Vice President of All India Trinamool Youth Congress.

Television
Soham also anchored a reality show Twinkle Twinkle Dancing Star launched by makers of Chirodini...Tumi Je Amar, Prem Amar, Challenge and Amanush. He was also the host of Parar Sera Bouthan, replacing Aneek Dhar, which aired on ETV Bangla. The show was then hosted by Aparajita Adhya. Soham has also appeared as a guest on television serial Bojhena Se Bojhena. Chakraborty, in 2019-20 along with Mithun Chakraborty and Srabanti Chatterjee judged the dance reality show Dance Dance Junior by StarJalsha.

Politics
Chakraborty joined All India Trinamool Congress in 2014. Chakraborty was appointed the All India Trinamool Youth Congress state vice president. Chakraborty contested 2016 West Bengal Legislative Assembly election from Barjora (Vidhan Sabha constituency). Chakraborty was defeated by Sujit Chakraborty of CPI-M by a margin of 616 votes.

Filmography

Web series

Accolades
In 2022 Chakraborty was awarded Mahanayak by the chief minister of West Bengal Mamata Banerjee.

References

External links 
 
 

Living people
Bengali male actors
Indian male child actors
Bengali male television actors
Male actors from Kolkata
1984 births